The Blue Cross Broad Street Run, which has taken place in Philadelphia on the first Sunday in May since the early 1980s, is the largest 10-mile road race in the United States (40,689 runners in 2012).

Course
The race starts at T.S. Park, in the Logan neighborhood, on the front lawn of historic Einstein Medical Center Philadelphia and at the athletic fields at Central High School. The course stretches south along Broad Street.  Runners pass Temple University, Roman Catholic High School for Boys, City Hall, Pennsylvania Academy of the Fine Arts, and the Kimmel Center.  The race finishes at the Navy Yard in South Philadelphia.  Due in part to its nearly flat (actually slightly downhill) route, it has become a favorite in the running community for those working to establish personal best times. All finishers receive a medal.

History
The race was first run in 1980 with 1454 men and 122 women finishing.  In that year and in 1981, participants ran straight through the courtyard of City Hall; since then, runners are diverted around the building.  

Until 1989, the race ended with a lap around the field at JFK Stadium in South Philadelphia.  After the stadium was condemned and demolished, the finish moved to FDR Park (on the other side of Broad Street), and then to the Navy Yard, about a quarter mile beyond the front gates.

Participation rose steadily through the 1990s and exploded by the mid-2000s. Since 2013, registration of single runners (though not teams) has been handled by lottery, with about 40,000 entrants, and roughly 35,000 runners finishing the race, the majority of them women.

Due to the COVID-19 pandemic, the 2020 race did not occur on the first Sunday of May as planned. It was postponed until at least Sunday, October 4th, 2020. This is the first time since the early 1980s that it didn't occur on the first Sunday of May.

Course records
 Open Male: Patrick Cheruiyot, 45:14, 2007
 Open Female: Allie Kieffer, 52:56, 2021 
 Master Male: Andrey Kuznetsov, 50:13, 2002
 Master Female: Sandra Mewett, 57:56, 1992
 Open Wheelchair Male: Tony Nogueira, 32:05, 2007
 Open Wheelchair Female: Jessica Galli, 35:59, 2001
 Master Wheelchair Male: Tony Nogueira, 33:52, 2008
 Master Wheelchair Female: Jacqui Kapinowski, 49:19, 2008

Past winners
Key:

Winners by Country

Top Philadelphia Finisher (Richard Lagocki Memorial Award)

Deaths
1998 - Richard Lagocki, 45, Philadelphia, Pennsylvania
2007 - Robert A. Massaroni, 29, Holland, Pennsylvania, was a 7th grade Social Studies teacher at Shafer Middle School in Bensalem, Pennsylvania.
2019 - Brian Smart, 25, Hatboro, Pennsylvania, was an athletic trainer at Upper Darby High School.

References

External links

 Broad Street Run official site

10-mile runs
Sports in Philadelphia
Road running competitions in the United States
Recurring sporting events established in 1980